Lombardy elected its tenth delegation to the Italian Senate on June 14, 1987. This election was a part of national Italian general election of 1987 even if, according to the Italian Constitution, every senatorial challenge in each Region is a single and independent race.

The election was won by the centrist Christian Democracy, as it happened at national level. Seven Lombard provinces gave a majority or at least a plurality to the winning party, while the agricultural Province of Pavia and Province of Mantua preferred the Italian Communist Party.

Background
Bettino Craxi's Italian Socialist Party reduced its gap with the Italian Communist Party after Enrico Berlinguer's death. Many minor parties obtained a seat: between them, for the first time, Umberto Bossi's Lega Lombarda (Lega Nord since 1991).

Electoral system
The electoral system for the Senate was a strange hybrid which established a form of proportional representation into FPTP-like constituencies. A candidate needed a landslide victory of more than 65% of votes to obtain a direct mandate. All constituencies where this result was not reached entered into an at-large calculation based upon the D'Hondt method to distribute the seats between the parties, and candidates with the best percentages of suffrages inside their party list were elected.

Results

|-
|- bgcolor="#E9E9E9"
!rowspan="1" align="left" valign="top"|Party
!rowspan="1" align="center" valign="top"|votes
!rowspan="1" align="center" valign="top"|votes (%)
!rowspan="1" align="center" valign="top"|seats
!rowspan="1" align="center" valign="top"|swing
|-
!align="left" valign="top"|Christian Democracy
|valign="top"|1,845,626
|valign="top"|34.4
|valign="top"|18
|valign="top"|1
|-
!align="left" valign="top"|Italian Communist Party
|valign="top"|1,319,356
|valign="top"|24.6
|valign="top"|12
|valign="top"|3
|-
!align="left" valign="top"|Italian Socialist Party
|valign="top"|901,296
|valign="top"|16.8
|valign="top"|8
|valign="top"|2
|-
!align="left" valign="top"|Italian Social Movement
|valign="top"|249,470
|valign="top"|4.7
|valign="top"|2
|valign="top"|=
|-
!align="left" valign="top"|Italian Republican Party
|valign="top"|217,157
|valign="top"|4.1
|valign="top"|2
|valign="top"|1
|-
!align="left" valign="top"|Federation of Green Lists
|valign="top"|139,573
|valign="top"|2.6
|valign="top"|1
|valign="top"|1
|-
!align="left" valign="top"|Lega Lombarda
|valign="top"|137,276
|valign="top"|2.6
|valign="top"|1
|valign="top"|1
|-
!align="left" valign="top"|Radical Party
|valign="top"|133,181
|valign="top"|2.5
|valign="top"|1
|valign="top"|=
|-
!align="left" valign="top"|Italian Democratic Socialist Party
|valign="top"|127,828
|valign="top"|2.4
|valign="top"|1
|valign="top"|1
|-
!align="left" valign="top"|Italian Liberal Party
|valign="top"|124,418
|valign="top"|2.3
|valign="top"|1
|valign="top"|1
|-
!align="left" valign="top"|Proletarian Democracy
|valign="top"|108,990
|valign="top"|2.0
|valign="top"|1
|valign="top"|1
|-
!align="left" valign="top"|Others
|valign="top"|56,617
|valign="top"|1.1
|valign="top"|-
|valign="top"|=
|- bgcolor="#E9E9E9"
!rowspan="1" align="left" valign="top"|Total parties
!rowspan="1" align="right" valign="top"|5,360,788
!rowspan="1" align="right" valign="top"|100.0
!rowspan="1" align="right" valign="top"|48
!rowspan="1" align="right" valign="top"|=
|}

Sources: Italian Ministry of the Interior

Constituencies

|-
|- bgcolor="#E9E9E9"
!align="left" valign="top"|N°
!align="center" valign="top"|Constituency
!align="center" valign="top"|Elected
!align="center" valign="top"|Party
!align="center" valign="top"|Votes %
!align="center" valign="top"|Others
|-
|align="left"|1
|align="left"|Bergamo
|align="left"|Severino Citaristi
|align="left"|Christian Democracy
|align="left"|46.1%
|align="left"|
|-
|align="left"|2
|align="left"|Clusone
|align="left"|Enzo Berlanda
|align="left"|Christian Democracy
|align="left"|52.0%
|align="left"|
|-
|align="left"|3
|align="left"|Treviglio
|align="left"|Gilberto Bonalumi
|align="left"|Christian Democracy
|align="left"|46.4%
|align="left"|
|-
|align="left"|4
|align="left"|Brescia
|align="left"|Guido Carli
|align="left"|Christian Democracy
|align="left"|38.9%
|align="left"|
|-
|align="left"|5
|align="left"|Breno
|align="left"|Franco SalviVittorio Marniga
|align="left"|Christian DemocracyItalian Socialist Party
|align="left"|45.0%20.3%
|align="left"|
|-
|align="left"|6
|align="left"|Chiari
|align="left"|Giovanni Prandini
|align="left"|Christian Democracy
|align="left"|47.7%
|align="left"|
|-
|align="left"|7
|align="left"|Salò
|align="left"|Elio Fontana
|align="left"|Christian Democracy
|align="left"|41.2%
|align="left"|
|-
|align="left"|8
|align="left"|Como
|align="left"|Gianfranco Aliverti
|align="left"|Christian Democracy
|align="left"|34.7%
|align="left"|
|-
|align="left"|9
|align="left"|Lecco
|align="left"|Cesare Golfari
|align="left"|Christian Democracy
|align="left"|40.9%
|align="left"|Pietro Fiocchi (PLI) 5.9%
|-
|align="left"|10
|align="left"|Cantù
|align="left"|Giuseppe Guzzetti
|align="left"|Christian Democracy
|align="left"|41.0%
|align="left"|
|-
|align="left"|11
|align="left"|Cremona
|align="left"|Ernesto VercesiRenzo Antoniazzi
|align="left"|Christian DemocracyItalian Communist Party
|align="left"|34.6%32.7%
|align="left"|
|-
|align="left"|12
|align="left"|Crema
|align="left"|Francesco Rebecchini|align="left"|Christian Democracy
|align="left"|41.7%
|align="left"|
|-
|align="left"|13
|align="left"|Mantua
|align="left"|Cirillo BonoraGiuseppe Chiarante
|align="left"|Christian DemocracyItalian Communist Party
|align="left"|33.1%32.0%
|align="left"|
|-
|align="left"|14
|align="left"|Ostiglia
|align="left"|Maurizio LottiGino Scevarolli
|align="left"|Italian Communist PartyItalian Socialist Party
|align="left"|40.3%17.8%
|align="left"|
|-
|align="left"|15
|align="left"|Milan 1
|align="left"|Giovanni SpadoliniGiovanni Malagodi
|align="left"|Italian Republican PartyItalian Liberal Party
|align="left"|12.5%8.3%
|align="left"|
|-
|align="left"|16
|align="left"|Milan 2
|align="left"|Giorgio Pisanò
|align="left"|Italian Social Movement
|align="left"|8.2%
|align="left"|
|-
|align="left"|17
|align="left"|Milan 3
|align="left"|Giorgio CoviFranco CorleonePier Giorgio SirtoriGuido Pollice
|align="left"|Italian Republican PartyRadical PartyFederation of Green ListsProletarian Democracy
|align="left"|8.9%4.1%4.0%3.1%
|align="left"|Bruno Pellegrino (PSI) 17.4%
|-
|align="left"|18
|align="left"|Milan 4
|align="left"|Alfredo Mantica|align="left"|Italian Social Movement
|align="left"|7.5%
|align="left"|
|-
|align="left"|19
|align="left"|Milan 5
|align="left"|Guido RossiMichele AchilliUnconstitutional result 
|align="left"|Italian Communist Party (Gsi)Italian Socialist Party
|align="left"|26.2%19.3%3.5%
|align="left"|seat ceded to Pollice
|-
|align="left"|20
|align="left"|Milan 6
|align="left"|Giorgio StrehlerGiorgio Ruffolo
|align="left"|Italian Communist Party (Gsi)Italian Socialist Party
|align="left"|28.3%20.0%
|align="left"|
|-
|align="left"|21
|align="left"|Abbiategrasso
|align="left"|Massimo RivaAchille Cutrera
|align="left"|Italian Communist Party (Gsi)Italian Socialist Party
|align="left"|29.4%18.3%
|align="left"|
|-
|align="left"|22
|align="left"|Rho
|align="left"|Rodolfo BolliniAntonio Natali
|align="left"|Italian Communist PartyItalian Socialist Party
|align="left"|31.2%18.3%
|align="left"|
|-
|align="left"|23
|align="left"|Monza
|align="left"|''None elected
|align="left"|
|align="left"|
|align="left"|Walter Fontana (DC) 32.8%Andrea Margheri (PCI) 25.1%
|-
|align="left"|24
|align="left"|Vimercate
|align="left"|Luigi GranelliGiovanna SenesiGuido Gerosa
|align="left"|Christian DemocracyItalian Communist PartyItalian Socialist Party
|align="left"|34.6%26.8%17.8%
|align="left"|
|-
|align="left"|25
|align="left"|Lodi
|align="left"|Alfredo DianaAntonio Taramelli
|align="left"|Christian DemocracyItalian Communist Party
|align="left"|34.0%33.0%
|align="left"|
|-
|align="left"|26
|align="left"|Pavia
|align="left"|Antonio Giolitti
|align="left"|Italian Communist Party (Gsi)
|align="left"|31.4%
|align="left"|Mario Viganò (DC) 30.8%
|-
|align="left"|27
|align="left"|Voghera
|align="left"|Giovanni AzzarettiLuigi Meriggi
|align="left"|Christian DemocracyItalian Communist Party
|align="left"|34.0%28.2%
|align="left"|
|-
|align="left"|28
|align="left"|Vigevano
|align="left"|Armando Cossutta
|align="left"|Italian Communist Party
|align="left"|37.2%
|align="left"|
|-
|align="left"|29
|align="left"|Sondrio
|align="left"|Vittorino ColomboFrancesco ForteGiampaolo Bissi
|align="left"|Christian DemocracyItalian Socialist PartyItalian Democratic Socialist Party
|align="left"|42.7%19.8%6.8%
|align="left"|
|-
|align="left"|30
|align="left"|Varese
|align="left"|Umberto Bossi
|align="left"|Lombard League
|align="left"|7.0%
|align="left"|Maria Paola Colombo (DC) 31.0%Giovanni Valcavi (PSI) 17.9%
|-
|align="left"|31
|align="left"|Busto Arsizio 
|align="left"|Augusto Rezzonico
|align="left"|Christian Democracy
|align="left"|34.6%
|align="left"|
|}

No senator obtained a direct mandate. Please remember that the electoral system was, in the other cases, a form of proportional representation and not a FPTP race: so candidates winning with a simple plurality could have (and usually had) a candidate (usually a Christian democrat) with more votes in their constituency.

Substitutions
Walter Fontana for Monza (32.8%) replaced Francesco Rebecchini in 1988. Reason: death.
Andrea Margheri for Monza (25.1%) replaced Antonio Taramelli in 1989. Reason: death.
Maria Paola Colombo for Varese (31.0%) replaced Ernesto Vercesi in 1991. Reason: death.
Giovanni Valcavi for Varese (17.9%) replaced Antonio Natali in 1991. Reason: death.
Bruno Pellegrino for Milan 3 (17.4%) replaced Giovanni Valcavi in 1991. Reason: resignation.
Pietro Fiocchi for Lecco 3 (5.9%) replaced Giovanni Malagodi in 1991. Reason: death.
Mario Viganò for Pavia (30.8%) replaced Enzo Berlanda in 1992. Reason: resignation.

Notes

Elections in Lombardy
1987 elections in Italy